Maurice Brian Foley (born March 28, 1960) is a judge of the United States Tax Court.

Foley received a Bachelor of Arts degree from Swarthmore College, a Juris Doctor from Boalt Hall School of Law at the University of California, Berkeley, and a Masters of Law in Taxation from Georgetown University Law Center. Prior to the appointment to the Court, he was an attorney for the Legislation and Regulations Division of the Internal Revenue Service, Tax Counsel for the United States Senate Committee on Finance, and Deputy Tax Legislative Counsel in the U.S. Treasury's Office of Tax Policy. He was appointed by President Bill Clinton as Judge, United States Tax Court, on April 9, 1995, for a term ending April 8, 2010. Foley was the first African-American appointed to the United States Tax Court.   He was reappointed on November 25, 2011, for a term ending November 24, 2026. Foley is also an adjunct professor at the University of Colorado School of Law. Foley is currently an adjunct professor at the University of Baltimore. On February 26, 2018, it was announced he would become the next Chief Judge of the Tax Court, effective June 1, 2018. On February 21, 2020, he was re-elected to a second two-year term effective June 1, 2020, his term as chief ended on May 31, 2022.

Attribution
Material on this page was copied from the website of the United States Tax Court, which is published by a United States government agency, and is therefore in the public domain.

References

External links

Biography of Judge Foley from U.S. Tax Court website
Clinton names 1st black U.S. tax judge - Maurice B. Foley nominated to US Tax Court, Jet Magazine,  November 21, 1994.

|-

1960 births
Living people
20th-century American judges
21st-century American judges
African-American judges
Judges of the United States Tax Court
People from Belleville, Illinois
Swarthmore College alumni
United States Article I federal judges appointed by Barack Obama
United States Article I federal judges appointed by Bill Clinton
UC Berkeley School of Law alumni
University of Colorado Law School faculty